Canadian National 6213 is a preserved 4-8-4 steam locomotive on static display in Toronto, Ontario, Canada at the Toronto Railway Museum (TRM) on the lands of the former CPR John St. Roundhouse. It was on active duty until 1959 and was donated by Canadian National Railway (CNR) to the City of Toronto government in 1960. It was on display at Exhibition Place until 2009 when it was moved to its current location.

History
No. 6213 was built in 1942 at the Montreal Locomotive Works. It was part of the Canadian National Railway's (CNR) fleet of 200 U-2-g class "Confederations", later "Northerns". No.6213 was retired from active duty in 1959. At the request of the City of Toronto government, the locomotive was donated by CNR to the City of Toronto government in 1960 and put on static display at Exhibition Place. At the request of the Parks Department, it was placed beside the Stanley Barracks' Officers' Quarters, delivered there by temporary rail track. It was officially turned over to the Mayor of Toronto Nathan Phillips on September 8, 1960.

Since 6213's retirement, the members of The Toronto Locomotive Preservation Society (TLPS), her primary caretaker, have faithfully worked to preserve the locomotive. The turntable and small trackage at the Roundhouse allows for the locomotive to be pushed and pulled into various spurs of the Toronto Railway Museum park. This has enhanced the TLPS' ability to inspect, grease and lube her moving parts, something key to her ongoing mechanical wellness and preservation. 

Plans are in the works for the summer of 2019, wherein the engine and tender will be subject to a significant cosmetic restoration. This will be the second significant makeover 6213 has had since retirement and reflects the City of Toronto's ongoing financial commitment to preserve its above-average condition "park locomotive". 

No. 6213 had only recently been through a significant refit at CNR's Stratford Shops before retirement and is, therefore, an ideal candidate for restoration to live steam at some point in the future. The TLPS continues to explore possible options of restoring this locomotive to operating condition.

Gallery

See also
Roundhouse Park
CN U-2,U-3,and U-4,Series,and CP K1a 4-8-4

References

Canadian National Railway
6213
4-8-4 locomotives
Steam locomotives of Canada
Preserved steam locomotives of Canada
Individual locomotives of Canada